This is a list of the feature films produced in Croatia in the 1950s.

For an alphabetical list of articles on Croatian films see :Category:Croatian films.

References

External links
Croatian film at the Internet Movie Database
Croatian Cinema Database at Filmski-Programi.hr 
List of Croatian feature films 1944–2006 kept at the Croatian National Archive 
Web archive 1954–2010 at the Pula Film Festival official website 

Croatian
1950s
Films